Michael Norbury (born 22 January 1969) is an English former professional football forward. Norbury made nearly 100 appearances in the Football League although the majority of his career has been spent in minor leagues.

Early career
Norbury began his career in non-League football with Ossett Town before entering the Football League with Scarborough in December 1989. However, he did not make an appearance at the club and soon returned to Ossett Town and then Bridlington Town. Norbury returned to the Football League with Cambridge United in February 1992 and played 26 league games for the club, fifteen of which were as a substitute. He moved to Preston North End that December and made 42 league appearances (32 starts, 10 substitute) for the club before moving on to Doncaster Rovers in November 1994, racking up 19 league starts and 8 substitute appearances. During his time at Belle Vue Norbury was loaned out to Linfield of the Irish Football League. He made a sole league appearance for them, starting in a 3–0 defeat at Glenavon.

Back to non-league
Norbury dropped out of the league by signing for Stafford Rangers after being released by Doncaster Rovers. He subsequently signed for Halifax Town where he discovered his goalscoring touch, hitting 14 goals in the 1997–98 season. Norbury would subsequently become known as a non-league journeyman and during two spells with Hednesford Town became notorious for his physical style of play which saw him rack up a number of red cards.

He joined Emley in summer 2001 and spent the 2001–02 season at the club before departing to join Stocksbridge Park Steels in June. He joined Belper Town in October but was gone again less than a month later, signing for Ossett Albion.

Coaching
Norbury entered coaching in the later part of the 2000s, becoming player/assistant manager at Goole in 2005. Norbury's fiery temper was again to the fore in 2006 when, in this role, he received a six-year touchline ban for two consecutive counts of foul and abusive language and threatening behaviour towards referees. He and manager Nigel Danby resigned from their posts in September 2009.

He was subsequently appointed manager of Worsbrough Bridge Athletic in October 2009, before leaving to become assistant manager at Harrogate Railway Athletic  in June 2010. In September 2013 he was appointed manager of Maltby Main. He resigned from Maltby in April 2015. In June 2015 he became manager of Glasshoughton Welfare, but resigned in November, becoming assistant manager at Armthorpe Welfare a few days later. He moved onto Ossett Town in February 2016, and then returned to Goole in November 2017.

References

1969 births
Living people
English footballers
Ossett Town F.C. players
Scarborough F.C. players
Bridlington Town A.F.C. players
Cambridge United F.C. players
Preston North End F.C. players
Doncaster Rovers F.C. players
Linfield F.C. players
Stafford Rangers F.C. players
Halifax Town A.F.C. players
Hednesford Town F.C. players
Wakefield F.C. players
Stocksbridge Park Steels F.C. players
Belper Town F.C. players
Ossett Albion A.F.C. players
Goole A.F.C. players
English Football League players
NIFL Premiership players
National League (English football) players
People from Hemsworth
English football managers
Worsbrough Bridge Athletic F.C. managers
Maltby Main F.C. managers
Glasshoughton Welfare A.F.C. managers
Association football forwards